The women's pole vault event  at the 1997 IAAF World Indoor Championships was held on March 8–9. It was the first time that this event was contested by women at the World Indoor Championships.

Medalists

Results

Qualification
Qualification: 4.10 (Q) or at least 12 best performers (q) qualified for the final.

Final

References

Pole vault
Pole vault at the World Athletics Indoor Championships
1997 in women's athletics